Ondřej Cink (born 7 December 1990) is a Czech cross-country mountain biker and road racing cyclist. At the 2012 Summer Olympics, he competed in the Men's cross-country at Hadleigh Farm, finishing in 14th place.  He finished in the same position at the 2016 Summer Olympics.

In October 2016  announced that Cink would join them and switch to road racing for the 2017 season. In June 2017, he was named in the startlist for the 2017 Tour de France. Cink returned to mountain biking for the 2018 season, with Primaflor–Mondraker–Rotor. He was on the start list for the 2018 Cross-country European Championship and he finished 10th.

Major results

Mountain Bike

2010
 3rd  Team relay, UCI World Championships
2012
 1st  Cross-country, UCI World Under-23 Championships
 1st  Cross-country, European Under-23 Championships
2013
 1st  Cross-country, National Championships
 3rd  Team relay, UEC European Championships
2015
 1st  Cross-country, National Championships
 3rd  Cross-country, UCI World Championships
2016
 3rd  Cross-country, UEC European Championships
2019
 1st  Cross-country, National Championships
2020
 1st  Cross-country, National Championships
2021
 1st  Cross-country, National Championships
 3rd Overall UCI XCO World Cup
2nd Leogang
2nd Les Gets
3rd Snowshoe
2022
 1st  Cross-country, National Championships

Road
2017
 9th Overall Vuelta a Andalucía

Grand Tour general classification results timeline

References

External links

1990 births
Living people
Czech male cyclists
Cross-country mountain bikers
Olympic cyclists of the Czech Republic
Cyclists at the 2012 Summer Olympics
Cyclists at the 2016 Summer Olympics
Cyclists at the 2015 European Games
European Games competitors for the Czech Republic
People from Rokycany
Cyclists at the 2020 Summer Olympics
Sportspeople from the Plzeň Region